Krisztián Füzi (born 13 November 1975 in Kapuvár) is a former Hungarian football player.

External links
Profile at hlsz.hu

1975 births
Living people
Hungarian footballers
Budapesti VSC footballers
Budapest Honvéd FC players
Győri ETO FC players
Vasas SC players
Budafoki LC footballers
ESMTK footballers

Association football midfielders